The BC Jonava, known for sponsorship reasons as the BC CBet, are a Lithuanian professional basketball team based in Jonava. The CBet compete in the Lietuvos Krepšinio Lyga (LKL).

The club was officially founded in 1999, and had been playing in the second-tier Lithuanian basketball league NKL (formerly known as LKAL) since its inception. Having been promoted to the top division, the club played a strong first season in the LKL, finishing fifth.

History 
The first basketball club in Jonava known as  "Statyba"  was founded in 1969. In 1980, a furniture enterprise started sponsoring the team. At the end of the season, BC Jonava won the Lithuanian second-tier league basketball championship. A decade later, the historic Jonava basketball club ceased to exist, and was replaced by the sports club "Triobet" in 1999.

Current roster

Depth chart

Squad changes for/during the 2021–22 season

In

|}

Out

|}

Season by season

 Cancelled due to the COVID-19 pandemic in Europe.

Notable players 
  Lukas Brazdauskis 
  Romanas Brazdauskis
  Ramūnas Butautas
  Vidas Ginevičius
  Rimantas Grigas
  Tomas Masiulis
  Darius Maskoliūnas 
  Darius Sirtautas
  Arvydas Šikšnius
  Edgaras Ulanovas 
  Arūnas Visockas
  Stanley Whittaker

References 

Basketball teams in Lithuania
Basketball teams established in 1999
Sport in Jonava
1999 establishments in Lithuania